Camp 020 at Latchmere House in southwest London was a British interrogation centre for captured German agents during the Second World War. It was run by Lieutenant Colonel Robin "Tin Eye" Stephens. Although other wartime interrogation centres were alleged to have used torture to extract confessions, Stephens denied claims that torture had been used at Camp 020. His instructions for interrogators ordered: “Never strike a man. In the first place it is an act of cowardice. In the second place, it is not intelligent. A prisoner will lie to avoid further punishment and everything he says thereafter will be based on a false premise.” 

It is known that Stephens punished those who disobeyed this order, and in one case ejected a senior War Office interrogator from the camp. After the war, Stephens ran another in Bad Nenndorf in Germany but was tried for the maltreatment of prisoners, some of whom died. He was tried in a British military court of inquiry in Germany and found not guilty, but others involved were convicted.

In 2012, Ian Cobain in the book Cruel Britannia claimed that documents obtained at the National Archives proved that torture methods had been used at Camp 020 to extract information and that 30 rooms there had been turned into cells with hidden microphones, further that there were mock executions and several inmates were treated brutally by the guards. Members of the British Union of Fascists had been held at Latchmere House during this period. They included the environmental pioneer Jorian Jenks.

There was a reserve camp, Camp 020R, at Huntercombe, which was used mainly for long term detention of prisoners.

The BBC docu-drama Spy! depicted Camp 020 in one episode in 1980. The depiction stirred controversy, as the BBC dramatisation showed the use of physical assault on individuals being interrogated.

In 2013, a pair of characters, based on Stephens, also appears in "The Cage", the second episode of series 7 of Foyle's War.

Inmates
Known wartime inmates included:

James Larratt Battersby
Hugo Bleicher
Gösta Caroli
Eddie Chapman
Jacques de Duve
Josef Jakobs
Werner von Janowski
Christiaan Lindemans
Karel Richard Richter
Wulf Schmidt
Duncan Scott-Ford
Gastão de Freitas Ferraz

See also 
 Double Cross System
 London Cage

References 

United Kingdom intelligence community
Intelligence services of World War II
Interrogations
Torture in the United Kingdom
Detention centers
British World War II crimes